Naâma Province is a province (wilaya) of Algeria named after its provincial seat, the town of Naâma. The region is dominated by a large sabkha. There is an airport in Mécheria.

History
The province was created from Saïda Province in 1984.

Administrative divisions
The province is divided into 7 districts (daïras), which are further divided into 12 communes or municipalities.

Districts

Communes

 Naâma
 Mécheria
 Aïn Séfra
 Tiout
 Sfissifa
 Moghrar
 Asla
 Djéniane Bourzeg
 Aïn Ben Khelil
 Mekmen Ben Amar
 Kasdir
 El Biod

References

 
Provinces of Algeria
States and territories established in 1984